Cephaloleia cyanea is a species of rolled-leaf beetle in the family Chrysomelidae, first found in Costa Rica, Colombia and Venezuela.

References

Further reading

Staines, Charles L., and Carlos García-Robledo. "The genus Cephaloleia Chevrolat, 1836 (Coleoptera, Chrysomelidae, Cassidinae)." ZooKeys 436 (2014): 1.
McKenna, Duane D., and Brian D. Farrell. "Molecular phylogenetics and evolution of host plant use in the Neotropical rolled leaf ‘hispine’beetle genus Cephaloleia (Chevrolat)(Chrysomelidae: Cassidinae)." Molecular Phylogenetics and Evolution 37.1 (2005): 117–131.

External links

Cassidinae
Beetles of South America